Valentin Alberti (1635–1697) was a Lutheran, orthodox philosopher and theologian from Silesia and was the son of a preacher.

He is known for defending Lutheran orthodoxy against the natural law views of Hugo Grotius, Samuel von Pufendorf and Christian Thomasius, and being an active polemicist against Roman Catholicism.

He began his studies at the University of Leipzig in 1656, obtaining the Magister degree in 1656. By 1663 he was already a professor of logic and metaphysics and in 1672 he became an associate professor of theology as well. Alberti was one of the principal representatives of Christian natural law Juris Naturae Orthodoxae Compendium Theologiae Conformatum and Samuel von Pufendorf's main opponent.

In 1665, he married the daughter of the Leipzig city judge Johannis Preibisi.

Alberti supervised the thesis of Christian Stridtbeckh on the possibility of a pact with the devil, in 1690 and 1716 first in Latin, 1723 also appeared in German translation. He held theological opinions maintaining the possibility of reincarnation of souls from purgatory.

External links
 Alberti's Neurotree profile
 Alberti biography

1635 births
1697 deaths
German philosophers
German Lutheran theologians
Leipzig University alumni
People from Austrian Silesia
17th-century German Protestant theologians
German male non-fiction writers
17th-century German writers
17th-century German male writers